Río Hato is a corregimiento in Antón District, Coclé Province, Panama. It is home to the Río Hato Airport. Its population as of 1990 was 8,888; its population as of 2000 was 10,886.

It is the site of Scarlett Martínez International Airport, a small international airport primarily used by Canadian leisure airlines.

References

Corregimientos of Coclé Province